Bernardo Baró (February 27, 1896 – June 1930) was a Cuban professional baseball player in the Negro leagues and the Cuban League. Primarily an outfielder, he also played some games as a pitcher or an infielder. He played for the Cuban Stars (West) and the Cuban Stars (East) in the Negro leagues and Almendares, San Francisco Park and Habana in the Cuban League from 1915 to 1929.

Baró led the Cuban League in batting average in 1922/23 with an average of .401. He ranks fifth all-time in Cuban League career batting average with an average of .311. In 1945 he was elected to the Cuban Baseball Hall of Fame.

Notes

References

External links
 and Baseball-Reference Black Baseball / Cuban League stats and Seamheads

1896 births
1930 deaths
Baseball outfielders
Cuban Stars (East) players
Cuban Stars (West) players
Almendares (baseball) players
San Francisco Park players
Habana players
People from Cárdenas, Cuba
Cuban expatriate baseball players in the United States